Valois is a neighbourhood in the city of Pointe-Claire, Quebec, Canada. It was once a separate village, many years ago, but was then merged with Pointe-Claire in 1911.

References

Pointe-Claire